The Rotary Art Spectacular is an annual art exhibition held in Brisbane, Queensland, and hosted by the Rotary Clubs of Stones Corner, Hamilton and Brisbane High-Rise.

History 
The first edition of the Rotary Art Spectacular was launched in 1979.

The 2020 edition of the event was cancelled to the covid-19 outbreak.

Description 
Rotary Art Spectacular is a non-for-profit based in New Farm, Queensland, Australia. The event is a week-long exhibition with opening night and an online gallery.

The exhibition has raised nearly $2 million for Brisbane Rotary community projects and local charities. Past beneficiaries include: the Heart Foundation, ROMAC, Drug ARM and the Cerebral Palsy League of Queensland. The 2018 beneficiaries are the AEIOU Foundation and the Rotary Clubs of Brisbane High–Rise, Hamilton and Stones Corner.

Since 2015, the event's curator has been Brett Lethbridge, an artist and the owner of Lethbridge Gallery in Paddington, Brisbane. Before 2015, the curator was Kim Slater.

Awards 
Awards are presented during opening night. These awards include a monetary prize. The awards are judged by a panel of art professionals.

Some of the awards include:

 Best of Show Prize Sponsored by Reliance - $10,000
 People's Choice Prize Sponsored by Aurizon - $1,000
 Best Oil Prize - $1,000
 Best Acrylic Prize - $1,000
 Best Watercolour Prize - $1,000
 Best 3D work Prize - $1,000

Past winners

References

External links 

 

Art exhibitions in Australia
Rotary International